Yevgeni Viktorovich Alekseyev (born 21 July 1982) is a former Russian professional football player.

Club career
He played in the Russian Football National League for FC Metallurg Krasnoyarsk in 2006.

References

1982 births
Living people
Russian footballers
Association football midfielders
FC Yenisey Krasnoyarsk players
FC Novokuznetsk players